Ochrolechia frigida is a species of lichen belonging to the family Ochrolechiaceae. It was first formally described by Olof Peter Swartz in 1781, as Lichen frigidus. Bernt Arne Lynge transferred it to Ochrolechia in 1928.

It is a known host species to the lichenicolous fungus species Sphaerellothecium araneosum and Weddellomyces tartaricola.

References

Lichens of Europe
Lichens described in 1781
Pertusariales
Taxa named by Olof Swartz